Nor Yerznka is a village in the Ashtarak Municipality of the Aragatsotn Province of Armenia.

References 

World Gazeteer: Armenia – World-Gazetteer.com

Populated places in Kotayk Province